Jean-Luc Houssaye is a retired French slalom canoeist who competed in the mid-1950s. He won two medals at the 1953 ICF Canoe Slalom World Championships in Meran with a gold in the C-2 team event and a bronze in the C-2 event.

References

French male canoeists
Living people
Year of birth missing (living people)
Medalists at the ICF Canoe Slalom World Championships